Littleton Common is a census-designated place (CDP) in the town of Littleton in Middlesex County, Massachusetts, United States. The population was 2,789 at the 2010 census.

Geography
Littleton Common is located at  (42.536606, -71.471984).

According to the United States Census Bureau, the CDP has a total area of 9.5 km (3.7 mi²). 9.0 km (3.5 mi²) of it is land and 0.4 km (0.2 mi²) of it (4.38%) is water.

Demographics

At the 2000 census there were 2,816 people in 1,098 households, including 774 families, in the CDP. The population density was 311.5/km (807.1/mi²). There were 1,142 housing units at an average density of 126.3/km (327.3/mi²).  The racial makeup of the CDP was 97.02% White, 0.28% African American, 0.07% Native American, 1.31% Asian, 0.04% Pacific Islander, 0.25% from other races, and 1.03% from two or more races. Hispanic or Latino of any race were 1.21%.

Of the 1,098 households 32.3% had children under the age of 18 living with them, 58.6% were married couples living together, 8.8% had a female householder with no husband present, and 29.5% were non-families. 23.6% of households were one person and 9.2% were one person aged 65 or older. The average household size was 2.56 and the average family size was 3.05.

The age distribution was 24.0% under the age of 18, 5.1% from 18 to 24, 34.1% from 25 to 44, 23.9% from 45 to 64, and 12.9% 65 or older. The median age was 39 years. For every 100 females, there were 91.8 males. For every 100 females age 18 and over, there were 93.2 males.

The median household income was $60,323 and the median family income was $69,375. Males had a median income of $46,806 versus $38,571 for females. The per capita income for the CDP was $26,966. About 4.7% of families and 5.2% of the population were below the poverty line, including 1.9% of those under age 18 and 4.9% of those age 65 or over.

References

Census-designated places in Middlesex County, Massachusetts
Census-designated places in Massachusetts